The Bulgarian Women's Union (Bulgarian: Български женски съюз, 'Balgarski Zhenski Sayuz' \'b&l-gar-ski 'zhen-ski s&-'yuz\), was a women's rights organisation active in Bulgaria from 1901 to 1944. 

In 1901, the organisation was founded by Vela Blagoeva, Ekaterina Karavelova, Anna Karima, Kina Konova, Julia Malinova, and Zheni Pateva. The organization was an umbrella organization of the 27 local women's organisations that had been established in Bulgaria since 1878. It was founded as a reply to the limitations of women's education and access to university studies in the 1890s, with the goal to further women's intellectual development and participation, arranged national congresses and used Zhenski glas as its organ. It was dissolved following the communist take over in Bulgaria in 1944 and replaced by the Bulgarian National Women's Union. 

 Chairpersons
 1901-1906: Anna Karima
 1908-1910: Julia Malinova
 1912-1926: Julia Malinova
 1926-1944: Dimitrana Ivanova

References

Citations

Bibliography

Feminist organizations in Bulgaria
1944 disestablishments in Bulgaria
Voter rights and suffrage organizations
Women's suffrage in Bulgaria